The Basilica di San Zeno (also known as San Zeno Maggiore or San Zenone) is a minor basilica of Verona, northern Italy constructed between 967 and 1398 AD. Its fame rests partly on its Romanesque architecture and partly upon the tradition that its crypt was the place of the marriage of Shakespeare's Romeo and Juliet. It stands adjacent to a Benedictine abbey, both dedicated to St Zeno of Verona.

History
St. Zeno died around 371–380. According to legend, at a site above his tomb along the Via Gallica, the first small church was erected by Theodoric the Great, king of the Ostrogoths. Erection of the present basilica and associated monastery began in the 9th century, when Bishop Ratoldus and King Pepin of Italy attended the translation of the saint's relics into the new church. This edifice was damaged or destroyed by a Magyar invasion in the early 10th-century, at which time Zeno's body was moved to the Cathedral of Santa Maria Matricolare: on May 21, 921, it was returned to its original site in the crypt of the present church. In 967, a new Romanesque edifice was built by Bishop Raterius, with the patronage of Otto I, Holy Roman Emperor.

On January 3, 1117, the church, along with most of the city, was damaged by an earthquake; the church was restored and enlarged in 1138. Work was completed in 1398 with the reconstruction of the roof and of the Gothic-style apse.

Exterior

Façade

The church of San Zeno constituted the model for all subsequent Romanesque edifices in Verona. Built of cream-coloured tuff, the façade is divided into three vertical components, the central nave surmounted by a pediment and the two aisle with sloping rooflines, all supported upon small pendanted blind arcades. The intersections of the three parts are marked by angled pilasters ending in foliate capitals below the pediment.

Across the façade, at the level of the door lintel, runs a shallow arcade of paired arches, divided by thin paired colonettes identical to those found above in the rose window. The pink marble of the arcades contrasts with the light yellow stone of the façade. The façade is further divided vertically by shallow pilasters, passing visually through the colonettes and into the pediment. The triangular pediment defines the nave and creates a striking contrast with the tuff stone of the rest of the church's façade, being of white marble divided by seven pink marble pilasters. In 1905, graffiti designs for a large Last Judgement were discovered on the pediment.

Central to the upper façade is a rose window, in the shape of a Wheel of Fortune, the work of one Brioloto, and one of the earliest examples in the Romanesque architecture of such a structure that was to become a particular feature of Gothic architecture. The outer rim of the window is decorated by six figures representing the vacillations of human life.

The porch is from the 12th century with lions at the base of its columns which are symbols of law and faith. The spandrels of the exterior arch each have a bas-relief portraying St. John the Baptist and St. John the Evangelist while above the arch are the Lamb and the blessing hand of God.

Above the door is a lunette with scenes of the Veronese history of the time, including: The Consecration of the Veronese Commune, St Zeno stamping on the Devil, (symbol of imperial power) and  St Zeno delivering a banner to the Veronese people. Under the lunette are bas-reliefs with the Miracles of St Zeno. The internal and external mensulae around the arch of the porch show the cycle of the months, which relate to the Wheel of Fortune of the window above.

The portal is flanked by 18 twelfth-century bas-reliefs. They portray scenes from the New and Old Testament, together with episodes of the life of Theoderic: the duel with Odoacer and the King hunting a deer, a symbol of the devil in Theoderic's Legend.

The sculptures associated with the porch, the portal itself, and those set into the wall to the right, depicting scenes from the Old Testament and the Flight of Theodoric, are the work of the sculptor Nicholaus and his workshop. The New Testament scenes and other historical subjects to the left of the porch are by a member of Nicholaus's workshop named Gugliemus. Their signature inscriptions are located over the lunette, in the background of "The Creation of Man" and on the cornice above the sculptures on the left.

The bronze door is decorated with 48 square panels. The identities of all the figures portrayed is not known: they include Saints Peter; Paul; Zeno; Helena; Matilda of Canossa (who had patronized the abbey); and her husband Godfrey, as well as the unknown sculptor of the work. Other panels show the three Theologic Virtues and, in the eight smallest ones, themes connected to music. As for the dating, some of the panels were made by Saxon masters of Hildesheim in the 11th century, while others are from Veronese masters (according to some scholars, including Benedetto Antelami himself).

Bell tower
The bell tower stands as a separate building. It is 62 m-high and was begun in 1045 and completed in 1178. It is stylistically Romanesque like the church, having a central vertical belt of alternating tuff and brickwork bands. It is divided in floors by cornices and small tuff arches, and rises to a double-storied bell chamber with triple mullioned windows. It is surmounted by a conical spire with small pinnacles at each angle. The exterior is decorated with Roman sculptures. There were six bells in chord of F#, cast in the years: 1067, 1149, 1423, 1498 and 1755. Only four of them are still ringing on the bell tower. The treble, cast during the 8th century, is now displayed in the museum (see Veronese bellringing art).

Interior

The interior of the church is on three levels with an extensive crypt on the lower level, the church proper and a raised presbytery.

Crypt
Since 921, the crypt has housed the body of St. Zeno in a sarcophagus, his face covered by a silver mask. The crypt has a nave with eight aisles the arches of which are supported by 49 columns, each having a different capital. On the entrance arches, the local sculptor Adamino da San Giorgio sculpted fanciful and monstrous animals. The crypt was restored in the 13th and 16th centuries.

Central church
The central church, known as Chiesa plebana, is of the Latin Cross layout with a nave, two aisles and transept. The aisles are divided by cruciform pilasters with alternating capitals with zoomorphic motifs and of Corinthian style.  The walls above the colonnade are polychrome. The trefoil-arched wooden ceiling dates from the 14th century.

Artworks in the central church include a Crucifix by Lorenzo Veneziano, a porphyry cup taken from a Roman bath-house, the octagonal baptismal font of the 13th-century, an altarpiece by Francesco Torbido and a 13th-century fresco of St Christopher.

Presbytery

The presbytery is raised on an arcade above the crypt which thus remains visible from the nave. The presbytery is accessible by stairs in the aisles.

The high altar houses the sarcophagus of Sts Lupicinus, Lucillus and Crescentianus, all Veronese bishops. On the left of the apse, over the sacristy's entrance, is a Crucifixion scene from the School of Altichiero, while in the small left apse is a red marble statue of St. Zeno of the 12th-century, which is the most venerated image in Verona.

The most important artwork of the basilica is the polyptych by Andrea Mantegna, known as San Zeno Altarpiece. Only the upper paintings are original, however, since the predellas, looted together with the former by the French in 1797, were never returned.

Church of San Procolo
Adjacent to the basilica is the small church of San Procolo, which houses the remains of Saint Proculus (Italian: San Procolo), the fourth bishop of Verona. It dates from the 6th or 7th century, being erected in the Christian necropolis across the Via Gallica. It is first mentioned however only in 845. After the 1117 earthquake it was totally rebuilt. It houses frescoes of various ages, including a Last Supper and St Blaise healing the Sick by Giorgio Anselmi. The 12th-century façade has a small narthex and two double mullioned windows. It has a single nave with a crypt, which is what remains of the original Palaeo-Christian structure. The crypt has a nave and two aisles.

The abbey

Attached to the basilica is an abbey was erected in the 9th century over a pre-existing monastery. Of the original structure, destroyed in the Napoleonic Wars, only a large brick tower and the cloisters survive. It had originally another tower and the abbot's palace. For long time the abbey was the city's official residence of the Holy Roman Emperors. In the 1980s a restoration discovered frescoes from the 12th to 15th centuries.

See also
 San Zeno Altarpiece:  by Renaissance painter Andrea Mantegna
 St. Anthony's Church:  architecture inspired by San Zeno.
 St. Mark's Anglican, a Parish church in Portland, Oregon erected in 1925 as a replica of San Zeno, Verona.

References

External links 
 Basilica of San Zeno

5th-century churches
10th-century churches in Italy
Zeno
San Zeno
San Zeno
Basilica churches in Veneto
Romanesque architecture in Verona
Churches completed in 1398
Minor basilicas in Veneto